Petit Loango is a town located in Ogooué-Maritime province, Gabon.

Populated places in Ogooué-Maritime Province
Ramsar sites in Gabon